Mark Ochieng is a Kenyan-Australian professional footballer who plays as a right back for Adelaide Olympic in the National Premier Leagues South Australia.

Early life
Ochieng's father played international football for Kenya. After growing up in Nairobi, the family moved to Plympton, South Australia when Ochieng was nine, where his father worked as an electrician.

Club career

Adelaide United
He made his senior professional debut for Adelaide United FC in the 2014 FFA Cup in a match against Wellington Phoenix FC at the Marden Sports Complex on 5 August 2014. Adelaide won the match 1–0 in regulation time.

On 12 January 2017, Ochieng scored his first goal for Adelaide against Melbourne City, the 87th-minute strike helping Adelaide United to just their second win of the season.

Ochieng was released by Adelaide United in May 2018.

References

External links
Mark Ochieng profile AdelaideUnited.com.au

1996 births
Living people
Association football midfielders
Association football defenders
Australian soccer players
Kenyan footballers
Australia youth international soccer players
Adelaide United FC players
A-League Men players
National Premier Leagues players
Australian people of Kenyan descent